Via de' Tornabuoni, or Via Tornabuoni, is a street at the center of Florence, Italy, that goes from Antinori square to ponte Santa Trinita, across Santa Trinita square, distinguished by the presence of fashion boutiques.

The street houses high fashion boutiques, belonging to designer brands such as Gucci, Salvatore Ferragamo, Enrico Coveri, Roberto Cavalli, Emilio Pucci and others; also boutiques of jewelry are here such as Damiani, Bulgari and Buccellati.

History

The road was once crossed by the city's Roman walls; in the early Middle Ages, it ran along the Mugnone river. Near the current Palazzo Strozzi   was the Brancazio Gate. With the 12th century enlargement of the walls, the stream was diverted and the road widened. At the time, it had different names, including  Via Larga dei Legnaiuoli and Via dei Belli Sporti.

After the creation of the Grand Duchy of Tuscany in the 16th century, via de' Tornabuoni was the seat of the processions from Palazzo Pitti  to via Maggio and Ponte Santa Trinita, as well as pallone col bracciale matches, Calcio Fiorentino games and horse races. In 1565 it received a porphyry column which still characterizes it.

Via de' Tornabuoni once housed the Casoni Cafè, where, in 1920, the  Negroni cocktail was invented by Camillo Negroni.

Buildings
Historical buildings on Via Tornabuoni include:

East side starting from Arno:
 Palazzo Spini Feroni, 14th century, site of Salvatore Ferragamo Museum
 Palazzo Minerbetti on Santa Trinita square, 14th century
 Palazzo Buondelmonti (in  Santa Trinita square), 15th century
 Palazzo Bartolini Salimbeni (in Santa Trinita square),  designed by Baccio d'Agnolo and built in 1517-1520 in late-Renaissance style
 Palazzo Medici Tornaquinci, 15th century
 Palazzo Altoviti Sangalletti, it was the host of Caffé Doney since 19th century
 Palazzo Gherardi Uguccioni or Alamanni
 Palazzo Strozzi (1489–1534)
 Palazzo Tornabuoni, a large palace built in the 16th century

West side starting from Arno:

 One of the palazzi dei Gianfigliazzi, Lungarno Corsini corner
 Torre dei Gianfigliazzi, 13th century
 Basilica di Santa Trinita
 Palazzo Minerbetti;
 Palazzo Strozzi del Poeta (or Giaconi)
 Palazzo del Circolo dell'Unione (or Corsi and della Commenda da Castiglione), built in 1559  under design by Vasari
 Palazzo Dudley
 Palazzo Viviani della Robbia, by Giovan Battista Foggini
 Palazzetto Tornabuoni
 Palazzo Larderel, or Palazzo Giacomini, by Giovanni Dosio

In Piazza degli Antinori (Antinori Square), adjacent to the northern terminus of Via Tornabuoni, are the following buildings:
 Palazzo Antinori, built between 1461 and 1469, and designed by Giuliano da Maiano
 Chiesa dei Santi Michele e Gaetano (Church of Saints Michael and Gaetano), a masterpiece of Florentine Baroque architecture (a much more detailed presentation of this church, including photographs, is available on an Italian language Wikipedia page titled Chiesa dei Santi Michele e Gaetano).

Sources

Streets of Florence
Shopping districts and streets in Italy